The B class of the Swedish State Railways (SJ) was a type of steam locomotive for mixed traffic, introduced in 1909. 96 locomotives were built for SJ by between 1909 and 1919. The 4-6-0 B class was part of the development of modern superheated locomotives that had begun with the A class in 1906. Intended for fast freight trains and heavy stopping passenger trains, they proved to be highly useful in all types of traffic, and remained in use until the end of steam operations in Sweden.

Eleven B class locomotives were sold to private railways during the 1930s, but all but one returned to SJ after the railway companies had been nationalized in the 1940s. One of the private operators, Stockholm–Västerås–Bergslagens Järnväg, had three more locomotives of the same type built, the last one in 1944. Most B class locomotives were eventually rebuilt with fully enclosed cabs, and some were equipped for oil-firing after the Second World War.

When the locomotives became unnecessary in the daily traffic they were placed in the strategic reserve. Some locomotives from the reserve were reactivated during the winter of 1965–1966 due to a temporary shortage of electric locomotives. Most survived into the 1990s, and several have been preserved by the Swedish Railway Museum and preservation societies in Sweden, while sales to heritage railways abroad failed to reach the expected numbers.

Design 

The B class mixed-traffic locomotives were part of the development of modern superheated locomotives that had begun with the A class in 1906 and the E class in 1907. The B class had bar frames, like the A class, and the leading bogie was based on that of the A class. Intended for fast freight trains and heavy passenger trains, the locomotives had six  driving wheels and large outside cylinders, giving a 50% larger starting tractive effort than for the A class.

The B class shared some characteristics with another 4-6-0 mixed-traffic locomotive, the Prussian P 8 class, and several sources state that they were based on the P 8, but another author describes them as "Swedish throughout".

A new type of boiler was designed for the B class; it was also used for the Gb class, and became known as the BGb type. Some other kinds of locomotives were later rebuilt with this type of boiler, creating the A2, Ga2, Ga4 and Mc classes. The boiler was given a high position.

History 

96 locomotives were built for SJ by Motala Verkstad, NOHAB and Vagn och Maskinfabriken Falun between 1909 and 1919; three more were built later for a private railway company. A very successful design, the B class turned out to be highly useful for all types of traffic. They were frequently used in heavy express trains, in addition to the intended passenger and freight train services.

Nevertheless, mainline electrification meant that the need for steam locomotives declined in the 1930s, making it possible to sell some B class locomotives to private railways, while some others were placed in reserve. This changed with rising international tensions: the B class locomotives were deemed to be "valuable in wartime conditions", and as such included in a 1938 refurbishment program. The locomotives that had been in reserve were quickly returned to service.

At least four locomotives were leased to the Norwegian State Railways during the German occupation of Norway.

Some modifications were made on the B class locomotives. Most were eventually given fully enclosed cabs, but a few were sold before being rebuilt. All locomotives built for SJ were delivered with A class tenders, but some were later given six-wheeled tenders of the C, C2 and L types and a type inherited from private Helsingborg–Hässleholms Järnväg. The shorter six-wheeled tenders made it possible to turn the locomotives on smaller turntables. Some B class locomotives were equipped for oil-firing after the Second World War. The fireboxes were not optimal for this purpose, having been designed for coal-firing, but the results were mostly satisfactory. Today, preserved oil-fired locomotives are popular for use in summer railtours, as they are less likely than coal-fired locomotives to cause wildfires.

The class remained in service with SJ until the end of steam. The need for steam locomotives declined again in the post-war era, but a large number of surplus locomotives were preserved in the strategic reserve, kept in usable condition to replace diesel-powered vehicles if the import of oil was interrupted or electric vehicles if the power supply was destroyed. The use of the reserve locomotives was mostly limited to a few trial runs, but harsh weather in the winter of 1965–1966 meant that an unusually large number of electric locomotives were out of service, and B, E and E2 class locomotives in the reserve were reactivated to haul trains on the electrified lines from Alvesta to Kalmar and Karlskrona.

The B class, together with the E, E2 and E10 classes, remained in the strategic reserve after most other types had been scrapped in the 1970s. Most of the locomotives were placed in sealed plastic bags with dehumidifiers to reduce the need of maintenance. A large number of B class locomotives were preserved in that manner until all steam locomotives were removed from the strategic reserve in 1990.

Private operators 

 
Six B class locomotives were sold to Bergslagernas Järnvägar (BJ) in 1935–1937, and four to Stockholm–Västerås–Bergslagens Järnväg (SWB) in 1936–1937. Three locomotives were soon transferred from BJ to close cooperator Södra Dalarnes Järnväg (SDJ), but it is unclear if they were ever formally registered with that company. All these locomotives returned to SJ when the railways were nationalized in the 1940s, but the former SWB locomotives remained on the network of that company until electrification. The type was known as the B3 class at BJ and as the A class (A1 from 1943) at SWB. The cost to purchase one locomotive in used condition was 85,000 Swedish crowns; a similar amount was then needed to refurbish the locomotives before they could be used.

Another B class locomotive was sold to Helsingborg–Hässleholms Järnväg (HHJ) in 1936, but was not intended to be used. Having been overhauled by HHJ, it was traded to BJ the year after for a H3 class locomotive. BJ sold it in 1947 to Stockholm–Nynäs Järnväg (SNJ), where it was given number 12, later changed to 2. SNJ had it modified for oil firing, as SJ demanded this to allow the steam locomotives of SNJ on the electrified tracks into Stockholm Central Station. The locomotive was scrapped in 1960 without having been reintegrated into the SJ fleet.

The B3 class differed from other locomotives of BJ, as the driver's position never was moved from the left to the right side. They were in fact hardly modified at all during their time on BJ, meaning that two former BJ locomotives are the only ones preserved in nearly original condition. SWB did make some modifications on their locomotives: the sandboxes were moved, and the blastpipes were modified, increasing the production of steam. SWB bought used C class tenders from SJ to their locomotives, and the original A class tenders were rebuilt to tank wagons.

Despite the purchase of the A1 class, SWB had too few 4-6-0 locomotives for their passenger trains. Three new A2 class locomotives were built by NOHAB in 1943–1944, based on the SJ B class. Some minor improvements were made, including fully enclosed cabs and the use of roller bearings. They were delivered with the modified sandbox position, but with unmodified blastpipes; the latter were quickly changed. The tender was of a new design, slightly larger than the C class tender, known as the B class after nationalization before being grouped with other six-wheeled tender types under the C3 designation. The former A2 class locomotives, known post nationalization a B class number 1695–1697, were last used in the 1960s in freight trains in the Dalarna region, where they were described by one driver as "the best steam locomotives ever built".

Preservation 

 
The long use of the B class in the strategic reserve meant that a large number of the locomotives survived into the 1990s, and nearly half of them have been preserved. Many locomotives remained in storage long after they had officially been removed from the strategic reserve, and interested buyers could inspect the locomotives to find the ones that were in the best condition; 38 locomotives were allocated to the Swedish Railway Museum and various heritage railways and preservation societies, although a few have been scrapped later.

There were hopes that the remaining locomotives could be sold to foreign heritage railways, but the fall of communism meant that many attractive steam locomotives were available at even lower prices in Eastern Europe. A few were sold nevertheless: B 1220 and 1289 are at the Zuid-Limburgse Stoomtrein Maatschappij (ZLSM) in the Netherlands, and SWB A2 101 at Nene Valley Railway in the United Kingdom. SJ B 1149, also known as SWB A1 96, was sold to the Belfast and Moosehead Lake Railroad in Maine, United States, which became the Belfast and Moosehead Lake Railroad (2009), which sold it in 2010 to the Great Smoky Mountains Railroad which in turn sold it in 2013 to the Discovery Park of America in Tennessee.

Some locomotives that had been in storage along the Inland Line were taken over by Inlandsbanan AB (IBAB), the commercial operator on that line, and B 1384 has been refurbished for use in tourist trains together with an E2 class locomotive.

Locomotive List

References 

Steam locomotives of Sweden
B
Standard gauge locomotives of Sweden